The Hockey Asian Champion Clubs Cup is an Asian field hockey tournament governed by Asian Hockey Federation (ASHF). It is introduced in 1991 for champions of hockey clubs in Asia. Champions from 2008 and upon will be representing Asia to the Hockey World Clubs Championship  which started 2009 in Barcelona, Spain.

History

Champions

Club
Asia